Moore Island may refer to one of several islands;

 Moore Island (Belcher Islands), an uninhabited island in the Qikiqtaaluk Region, Nunavut
 Moore Island (Boat Passage), an uninhabited island in the Qikiqtaaluk Region, Nunavut
 Moore Island (Hopewell Islands), an uninhabited island in the Qikiqtaaluk Region, Nunavut
 Moore Island (Intrepid Passage), an uninhabited island in the Qikiqtaaluk Region, Nunavut
 Moor Island, formerly Moore Island, an uninhabited island in the Kivalliq Region, Nunavut

See also
 Moore's Island, one of the districts of the Bahamas, on the Abaco Islands
 Moore Islands, a group of small islands in the North Coast region of British Columbia